Sybille Bianca Giulietta Eysenck (March 1927 – December 2020) was a personality psychologist and the widow of the psychologist Hans Eysenck, with whom she collaborated as psychologists at the Institute of Psychiatry, University of London, as co-authors and researchers.

Life 
Sybil Eysenck (née Rostal) was born on 16 March 1927 as the only child of violinist Max Rostal and cellist Sela Trau (1898–1991) in Vienna. In 1934, she went with her parents into exile to Great Britain. In 1946 she became a naturalised British subject. Sybil Eysenck died on 5 December 2020 in London, England, at the age of 93.

Sybil Eysenck received a BSc in psychology in 1952, and a PhD in Psychology in 1955, both from the University of London. After a long career (1953–1992) as a psychologist and senior lecturer at the Institute of Psychiatry in London, England, she retired in 1992. Eysenck was a magistrate in London in the 1980's.

Eysenck was the editor-in-chief of the Elsevier journal Personality and Individual Differences and the author of the Junior Eysenck Personality Inventory and its accompanying manuals.

References 

1927 births
Academic journal editors
Jewish emigrants from Austria to the United Kingdom after the Anschluss
English psychologists
Personality psychologists
Women magazine editors